Dandara is a 2D platformer and Metroidvania video game developed by Brazilian studio Long Hat House and published by Raw Fury in 2018.

Gameplay
Dandara is a 2D platformer and Metroidvania game. Players take control of the eponymous protagonist who traverses the game's world by warping between white surfaces. The game's protagonist and themes are based on the life of Brazilian historical figure Dandara.

Development and release
Dandara was developed by Brazilian studio Long Hat House and published by Raw Fury. The game was released for Android, iOS,  Linux, macOS, Windows, Nintendo Switch, PlayStation 4 and Xbox One on 6 February 2018.

Reception

Reception towards Dandara was generally mixed, leaning towards positive. It was better accepted in publications centered towards mobile platforms, showing its origins as a touchscreen-first game.

The game was nominated for "Portable Game of the Year" at the 22nd Annual D.I.C.E. Awards.

References

External links
 

2018 video games
Android (operating system) games
IOS games
Indie video games
Linux games
MacOS games
Windows games
Nintendo Switch games
PlayStation 4 games
Retro-style video games
Xbox One games
Metroidvania games
Video games developed in Brazil
Video games featuring black protagonists
Video games featuring female protagonists
Video games set in Brazil
Video games set in the 17th century
Raw Fury games
Single-player video games